Bonsai is a Japanese art form using miniature trees grown in containers. Similar practices exist in other cultures, including the Chinese tradition of penjing from which the art originated, and the miniature living landscapes of Vietnamese hòn non bộ, but this article describes the Japanese tradition.

The Japanese art of bonsai dates back over a thousand years, and has evolved its own unique aesthetics and terminology. A key design practice in bonsai is a set of commonly understood, named styles that describe canonical tree and setting designs. These well-known styles provide a convenient shorthand means for communicating about existing bonsai and for designing new ones.

Concept of styles

Styles can be grouped based on different criteria, such as the trunk orientation or the number of trunks in the bonsai specimen. Some of the major style groupings include:
 Trunk orientation. A frequently used set of styles describe the orientation of the bonsai tree's main trunk. Different terms are used for a tree with its apex directly over the center of the trunk's entry into the soil (these are the upright styles, including chokkan and moyogi), slightly to the side of that center (e.g., sho-shakan), deeply inclined to one side (e.g., chu-shakan and dai-shakan), and inclined below the point at which the trunk of the bonsai enters the soil (the cascade or kengai styles).
 Trunk and bark surface. A number of styles describe the trunk shape and bark finish. For example, a bonsai with a twisted trunk is nebikan (also nejikan (ねじ幹)), and one with a vertical split or hollows is sabakan. The deadwood bonsai styles identify trees with prominent dead branches or trunk scarring.
 Trunk and root placement. Although most bonsai trees are planted directly into the soil, there are styles describing trees planted on rock. For example, the root-over rock style is deshojo (出猩々), and the style in which trees are rooted wholly within (atop or on the sides of) a large rock is ishizuki.
 Multiple trunks. While the majority of bonsai specimens feature a single tree, there are well-established style categories for specimens with multiple trunks. Within these styles, a bonsai can be classified by number of trunks alone (e.g., sokan for a double trunk from a single root, soju for two separate trees, sambon-yose for three trees, and so on). The configuration of the trunks can also be described by specific styles, including raft (ikadabuji or ikadabuki) and sinuous (netsunagari) styles for multiple trees growing from a connected root, and the general term yose-ue for multiple unconnected trees in large number.

These terms are not mutually exclusive, and a single bonsai specimen can exhibit more than one style characteristic. When a bonsai specimen falls into multiple style categories, the common practice is to describe it by the dominant or most striking characteristic. For example, an informal upright tree with prominent areas of missing bark and trunk scarring will be described as a sharimiki rather than a moyogi.

Purposes

The system of styles serves many purposes, some practical, some aesthetic. In their simplest and most common application, styles provide a form of shorthand description for bonsai specimens. The brief style term appears in catalog descriptions, usually with a species identifier, and thereby compactly describes the subject bonsai. Style names can also be used to group comparable specimens in bonsai viewing and competition. Even considering the styles simply as descriptive labels, the system still simplifies bonsai teaching and learning, and provides widely understood terms for public communications about bonsai.

Predefined styles also aid the designer in making a development plan for a pre-bonsai tree. The untrained specimen may have characteristics that suggest or rule out certain styles. For example, a crooked trunk makes a tree unsuitable for the formal upright style, and suggests to the designer that the tree may be trained better as an informal upright or a slanted style instead. A damaged or highly asymmetrical tree may not appear suitable for bonsai development, yet may be adapted to an uncommon style like windswept or raft, which both work for trees that have branches only on one side of the trunk. Some tree species are not suitable for some styles: a bonsai artist working with a deciduous tree will not produce bonsai in the cascade style, for example. The designer can evaluate the pre-bonsai specimen against the catalog of accepted styles to determine what branches to remove or reshape, what foliage to remove or encourage, and what detailed shaping to apply to trunk and branches.

Although the styles will guide a bonsai designer, they are not completely deterministic. A review of actual bonsai from competition catalogs will reveal that even highly regarded specimens rarely meet every rule laid out for their style. The species of the bonsai, the age of the tree when it began bonsai training, the tree's pre-existing shape and structure, even the bonsai artist's training and preferences, strongly affect the shape of the resulting bonsai. These competing influences ensure that the style system acts mostly as a creative aid, not a dominating constraint, in producing a finished bonsai.

Catalog of styles

Common styles

See also
 Bonsai aesthetics - aesthetics of Japanese bonsai
 Bonsai cultivation and care - cultivation and care of small, container-grown trees
 Deadwood bonsai techniques - description of deadwood techniques and effects in small trees
 Penjing – Chinese precursor to bonsai
 Saikei – tray gardens using bonsai
 Indoor bonsai - cultivation and care of trees grown indoors in containers

References

Bonsai